The German Air Sports Association (Deutscher Luftsportverband, or DLV e. V.) was an organisation set up by the Nazi Party in March 1933 to establish a uniform basis for the training of military pilots. Its chairman was Hermann Göring and its vice-chairman Ernst Röhm.

History
Since the Treaty of Versailles officially forbade Germany from building fighter planes of any sort, the German Air Sports Association used gliders to train men still officially civilians for the future Luftwaffe. The first steps towards the Luftwaffe's formation were undertaken just months after Adolf Hitler came to power. Hermann Göring, a World War I ace with 22 victories and the holder of the Orden Pour le Mérite, became National Kommissar for aviation with former  director Erhard Milch as his deputy. On 25 March 1933 the German Air Sports Association absorbed all private and national organizations, whilst retaining its 'sports' title. In April 1933 the Reichsluftfahrtministerium (RLM – Reich Air Ministry) was established. The RLM was in charge of development and production of aircraft, and soon afterwards the test site or Erprobungsstelle at Rechlin became its testing ground, a military airfield that had been first established in August 1918. Göring's control over all aspects of aviation became absolute.

The German Air Sports Association was dissolved in 1937 and replaced with the National Socialist Flyers Corps, a corporation under public law and subordinate to Reichsluftfahrtminister Göring.

Insignia

See also
Aircrew Badge (Nazi)

References

Sports organizations established in 1933
Organizations disestablished in 1937
Nazi Party organizations
Irregular military air services
Aviation organisations based in Germany
1933 establishments in Germany
1937 disestablishments in Germany
Hermann Göring
Gliding associations
Gliding in Germany